Tia Gostelow (born 12 October 1999) is an Indigenous Australian singer-songwriter from Mackay, Queensland. Gostelow released her debut studio album, Thick Skin, in 2018 on Lovely Records. Thick Skin was nominated for Album of the Year at the 2019 National Indigenous Music Awards.

Life and career

1999–2014 : Early Life
Gostelow was born on 12 October 1999 and grew up in the regional Australian town of Mackay, Queensland; adjacent to the Coral Sea coast, Australia. When Gostelow was 4, she relocated to Groote Eylandt a remote island in the Gulf of Carpentaria with her family for her father's work. She spent six years there before moving back to Mackay where she went to High School.

Gostelow's Indigenous hereditary roots are based in Cape York's Luma Luma tribe where her grandfather is an elder.

2015–present: Thick Skin
In 2015, at the age of 16, Gostelow wrote "State of Art" which was released in February 2016 as her debut single. "State Of Art" received airplay on  national youth broadcaster Triple J, won the station's 2016 Indigenous Initiative and placed top 5 in Triple J Unearthed High in 2016. This performance coincided with the release of her second single "Vague Utopia" which was also received high rotation on Triple J.

In May 2017, Gostelow released single "That's What You Get". At the 2017 Queensland Music Awards, the single was nominated for 6 awards, winning two.

In June 2018, released single "Strangers".

In September 2018, Gostelow released her debut studio album, Thick Skin to positive reviews. At the 2019 Queensland Music Awards, Gostelow made Australian history by being the youngest winner of Album of the Year.

2019–present: Chrysalis
In July 2019, Gostelow released "Get to It", her first new material single since Thick Skin.

In April 2020, ABC records released a live album titled Triple J Live at the Wireless. The album was recorded at The Lansdown Hotel, Sydney on 23 February 2019, during her  Thick Skin tour. It was first broadcast on 6 May 2019, before its official release in April 2020.

In October 2020, Gostelow released Chrysalis.

Influences 
Gostelow has openly discussed her musical influences as foremost fellow regional singer-songwriter Melody Pool, as well as Mumford & Sons and The Jungle Giants.

Gostelow has said she was also inspired to play music after seeing Taylor Swift perform live in Australia.

Discography

Studio albums

Live albums

Singles

As lead artist

As featured artist

Non-single album appearances

Awards and nominations

AIR Awards
The Australian Independent Record Awards (commonly known informally as AIR Awards) is an annual awards night to recognise, promote and celebrate the success of Australia's Independent Music sector.

! 
|-
| AIR Awards of 2021
| Chrysalis
| Best Independent Pop Album or EP
| 
|

National Indigenous Music Awards
The National Indigenous Music Awards (NIMA) recognize excellence, dedication, innovation and outstanding contribution to the Northern Territory music industry. It commenced in 2004.

! 
|-
! scope="row" rowspan="1"| 2017
| herself
| New Talent of the Year
| 
|
|-
! scope="row" rowspan="1"| 2019
| Thick Skin
| Album of the Year
| 
|
|-
! scope="row" rowspan="2"| 2021
| Chrysalis
| Album of the Year
| 
|rowspan="2"| 
|-
| "Two Lovers"
| Film Clip of the Year
| 
|}

Queensland Music Awards
The Queensland Music Awards (previously known as Q Song Awards) are annual awards celebrating Queensland, Australia's brightest emerging artists and established legends. They commenced in 2006.
 
|-
|rowspan="2"| 2017
| "Vague Utopia"
| Folk Song of the Year
| 
|-
| "State of Art"
| Schools Song of the Year
| 
|-
|2019
| Thick Skin
| Album of the Year 
| 
|-

References

Living people
Place of birth missing (living people)
21st-century Australian musicians
Australian women musicians
1999 births